The Virgin Queen is a 1955 American DeLuxe Color historical drama film directed by Henry Koster and starring Bette Davis, Richard Todd and Joan Collins. Filmed in CinemaScope, it focuses on the relationship between Elizabeth I of England and Sir Walter Raleigh.

The film marks the second time Davis played the English monarch; the first was The Private Lives of Elizabeth and Essex (1939). It was also the first Hollywood film for Australian actor Rod Taylor.

Charles LeMaire and Mary Wills were nominated for an Oscar for Best Costume Design of a Color Production. LeMaire then won the award for another film instead; Love Is a Many-Splendored Thing (1955).

Plot
In 1581, Walter Raleigh, recently returned from the fighting in Ireland, pressures unwilling tavern patrons into freeing from the mud the stuck carriage of Robert Dudley, Earl of Leicester. When Leicester asks how he can repay the kindness, Raleigh asks for an introduction to Queen Elizabeth I, to whom Leicester is a trusted adviser. Leicester grants the request.

Elizabeth takes a great liking to Raleigh and his forthright manner, much to the disgust of her current favorite, Christopher Hatton. As the court ventures outside, Raleigh graciously drapes his cloak (an expensive item borrowed from a reluctant tailor) over some mud so that the queen need not soil her shoes. At dinner, Raleigh reveals his dream of sailing to the New World to reap the riches there. Elizabeth decides to make him the captain of her personal guard. He enlists his Irish friend, Lord Derry.

Meanwhile, Beth Throckmorton, one of the queen's ladies in waiting, very forwardly makes Raleigh's acquaintance. Raleigh's relationship with both ladies is stormy. Beth is jealous of his attentions to Elizabeth, while the queen is often irritated by his independence and constant talk of the New World. Hatton does his best to inflame her annoyance, but she is too clever to be taken in.

When Hatton informs Elizabeth that an Irishman is a member of her guard, Raleigh is stripped of his captaincy when he protests that his friend is loyal and refuses to dismiss him. Banished from court, Raleigh takes the opportunity to secretly marry Beth. Soon after, however, he is restored to Elizabeth's favor.

Finally, Elizabeth grants Raleigh not the three ships he desires, but one. He enthusiastically sets about making modifications. In private, however, Elizabeth reveals within Beth's hearing that her intentions do not include his actually leaving England. When so informed, Raleigh makes plans to sail to North America without royal permission.

Hatton tells the queen not only of Raleigh's plot, but also that he is married to Beth. Elizabeth orders the couple's arrest. Raleigh delays those sent to take him into custody so that Derry can try to take Beth into hiding in Ireland, but they are overtaken on the road, and Derry killed. Raleigh and Beth are sentenced to death, but in the end, Elizabeth releases them. They set sail for the New World.

Cast 
 Bette Davis as Queen Elizabeth I
 Richard Todd as Sir Walter Raleigh
 Joan Collins as Elizabeth Throckmorton
 Jay Robinson as Chadwick
 Herbert Marshall as Robert Dudley, 1st Earl of Leicester
 Dan O'Herlihy as Lord Derry
 Robert Douglas as Sir Christopher Hatton
 Romney Brent as French Ambassador
 Leslie Parrish as Anne
 Lisa Daniels as Mary
 Rod Taylor as Cpl. Gwilym (Uncredited)
 Nelson Leigh as Physician (Uncredited)

Comic book adaptation
 Dell Four Color #644 (August 1955)

See also
 The Virgin Queen (1928 film)

References

External links 

 
 
 
 

1955 films
1950s biographical drama films
1950s historical drama films
CinemaScope films
American biographical drama films
Films about Elizabeth I
Films directed by Henry Koster
Films produced by Charles Brackett
Films scored by Franz Waxman
Films set in Tudor England
Films with screenplays by Harry Brown (writer)
20th Century Fox films
Films adapted into comics
Cultural depictions of Walter Raleigh
1955 drama films
1950s English-language films
1950s American films